is a Japanese rugby sevens player. She was a member of the Japan women's national rugby sevens team that competed at the 2016 Summer Olympics.

Mitsugi was a member of the Japanese sevens team that played at the 2016 France Women's Sevens in Clermont-Ferrand, France.

References

External links 
 Japan Player Profile
 

1992 births
Living people
Olympic rugby sevens players of Japan
Japanese rugby sevens players
Japan international women's rugby sevens players
Sportspeople from Miyazaki Prefecture
Rugby sevens players at the 2016 Summer Olympics
Rugby union players at the 2010 Asian Games
Asian Games competitors for Japan
21st-century Japanese women